This is a list of foreign players (i.e. non-Italian players) in Serie A. The following players:
Have played at least one Serie A game for the respective club (seasons in which and teams that a player did not collect any caps in Serie A for have NOT been listed).
Have not been capped for the Italian national team on any level, independently from the birthplace, except for players born in San Marino and active in the Italian national team before the first official match of the Sammarinese national team played on 14 November 1990 and players of Italian formation born abroad from Italian parents (so called 'Oriundi').
Have been born in Italy and were capped by a foreign national team. This includes players who have dual citizenship with Italy.

Players are sorted by the State, according to the FIFA eligibility rules: 
They played for in a national team on any level. For footballers that played for two or more national teams it prevails:
The one he played for on A level.
The national team of birth.
If they never played for any national team on any level, it prevails the state of birth. For footballers born in dissolved states prevails the actual state of birth (e.g.: Yugoslavia -> Serbia, Montenegro, Croatia, etc.).

Africa (CAF)

Cameroon 
Ajara Nchout

Malawi 
Tabitha Chawinga

South Africa 
 Refiloe Jane

Asia (AFC)

Australia 
 Isobel Dalton – Napoli – 2020–2021
 Lisa De Vanna – Fiorentina – 2019–2020
 Jacynta Galabadaarachchi – Napoli – 2020–2021
 Aivi Luik – Pomigliano – 2021–2022
 Ella Mastrantonio – Lazio – 2021, Pomigliano – 2022

Japan 
Yui Hasegawa 
Moeka Minami

Europe (UEFA)

Albania 
 Alma Hilaj

Austria 
Isabella Kresche

Belgium 
Diede Lemey
Heleen Jaques

Bulgaria 
Evdokiya Popadinova

Croatia 
Sandra Žigić

Czech Republic 
Andrea Stašková
Kamila Dubcová
Michaela Dubcová

England 
 Eniola Aluko
 Yvonne Baldeo
 Debbie Bampton
 Dot Cassell
 Kerry Davis
 Natasha Dowie
 Shameeka Fishley
 Sue Lopez
 Lianne Sanderson
Chelsea Weston
Paige Williams
Katie Zelem

Estonia 
Vlada Kubassova

Denmark 
 Susanne Augustesen
 Caroline Møller
 Lone Smidt Nielsen
 Sofie Junge Pedersen
 Caroline Pleidrup

Finland 
Anna Auvinen
Sanni Franssi
Tuija Hyyrynen
Nora Heroum

France 
 Laura Agard
 Pauline Peyraud-Magnin
 Lindsey Thomas
 Annahita Zamanian

Germany 
Anke Preuß

Hungary 
Henrietta Csiszár

Iceland 
 Sara Björk Gunnarsdóttir
 Alexandra Jóhannsdóttir
 Anna Björk Kristjánsdóttir

Ireland 
 Gráinne Cross – Fiammamonza – 1986
 Lisa Curran – Firenze – 1991–1993
 Niamh Farrelly – Parma – 2022–
 Anne O'Brien – Lazio, Trani, Lazio, CF Modena, Napoli, Prato, Reggiana, Milan 82 – 1976–1994
 Gráinne O'Malley – Carrara – 1991–1992
 Lois Roche – Florentia – 2018–2020
 Stephanie Roche – Florentia – 2018–2020

Malta 
Kailey Willis
Shona Zammit

Netherlands 
Lineth Beerensteyn
Stefanie van der Gragt
Vera Pauw

Norway 
Emilie Haavi
Anja Sønstevold

Poland 
Małgorzata Mesjasz

Portugal 
Cláudia Neto

Romania 
Cristina Carp
Camelia Ceasar
Adina Giurgiu
Florentina Spânu
Sabina Radu
Bianca Raicu
Laura Rus

Scotland 
 Lana Clelland
 Edna Neillis
 Christy Grimshaw

Spain 
 Verónica Boquete
 Paloma Lázaro
 Adriana Martín

Sweden 
 Sejde Abrahamsson
 Kosovare Asllani
 Marija Banušić
 Evelina Duljan
 Lisa Ek
 Julia Karlernäs
 Julia Molin
 Amanda Nildén
 Stephanie Öhrström
 Linda Sembrant
 Pia Sundhage

Switzerland 
Vanessa Bernauer
Nina Stapelfeldt
Sabina Wölbitsch

North and Central America, Caribbean (CONCACAF)

Canada 
 Julia Grosso
 Charmaine Hooper
 Alyssa Lagonia

Guatemala 
Ana Lucía Martínez

Jamaica 
Beverly Ranger
Trudi Carter

Mexico 
Mariana Díaz Leal

Panama 
Lineth Cedeño

United States 
Celeste Boureille
Colette Cunningham
Grace Cutler
Megan McCarthy
Ashley Nick
Aricca Vitanza
Catiana Vitanza

South America (CONMEBOL)

Argentina 
Sole Jaimes

Brazil 
Andressa Alves

Colombia 
Lady Andrade
Yoreli Rincón

Peru 
 Claudia Cagnina – Tavagnacco – 2019–2020

Venezuela 
 Sonia O'Neill – Pink Sport Bari – 2018–2019

Notes

References

 
Italy
Serie A (women's football)
 
Association football player non-biographical articles